Novoekonomichne is an urban-type settlement in the Pokrovsk Raion, Donetsk Oblast (province) of eastern Ukraine. The population is

Demographics
Native language as of the Ukrainian Census of 2001:
 Ukrainian 9.12%
 Russian 90.62%
 Belarusian and Moldovan (Romanian) 0.03%

References

Urban-type settlements in Pokrovsk Raion